Daniel "Danny" Robles (born January 4, 2002) is an American professional soccer player who plays for Northern Colorado Hailstorm in the USL League One.

Career
Robles  joined the Seattle Sounders FC academy in 2015. He made his debut for USL club Seattle Sounders FC 2 on September 5, 2018, appearing as a half-time substitute in a 4–4 draw with Tulsa Roughnecks.

Robles signed a professional contract with Seattle Sounders FC 2 ahead of their 2019 season.

Robles signed with new USL League One club Northern Colorado Hailstorm on February 25, 2022, ahead of their inaugural season.

References

External links

2002 births
Living people
American soccer players
Association football forwards
Northern Colorado Hailstorm FC players
People from Burien, Washington
Tacoma Defiance players
Soccer players from Washington (state)
Sportspeople from King County, Washington
USL Championship players